New Liberty is an extinct town in northeastern Oregon County, in the U.S. state of Missouri. The GNIS classifies it as a populated place.

A post office called New Liberty was established in 1914, and remained in operation until 1941. Besides the post office, the community had a schoolhouse. The community derives its name from a nearby church of the same name.

References

Ghost towns in Missouri
Former populated places in Oregon County, Missouri